Gyani Maiya Sen-Kusunda (1937 – 25 January 2020) was a Kusunda community elder from Nepal. She was presumed to be the last known speaker of Kusunda, a language isolate listed as the critically endangered language in the Atlas of the World's Languages in Danger. Sen-Kusunda could not converse with others in her community in Kusunda despite being fluent as the language fell out of use over time after the nomadic Kusunda community started to settle in villages and married outside the community. She was interviewed widely by linguists and other scholars in an effort to document the Kusunda language.

She died on 25 January 2020.

Early life 
Sen-Kusunda was born in 1937 in the Dang district of Nepal to a family of hunter-gatherers and settled in the Kulmor village in Dang. Until the death of her mother in 1985, she actively spoke in Kusunda but did not have any scope for conversation in the language. By 2012, three Kusunda speakers, the mother and daughter duo Puni Thakuri and Kamala Khatri in addition to Sen-Kusunda, were reported. After Thakuri's death that year and Khatri's departure from Nepal in search of livelihoods left Sen-Kusunda to be the sole Kusunda speaker. In 2010 the Tribhuvan University ran a language documentation and preservation programme by inviting both Khatri and Sen-Kusunda to Kathmandu but the project stalled due to shortage of funds.

Career 
Sen-Kusunda worked with scholars including B.K. Rana, Brian Houghton Hodgson, David E. Watters, Johan Reinhard, Madhav Prasad Pokharel and Uday Raj Aaley for the documentation of the Kusunda language.

References

External links 

 

1937 births
2020 deaths
Nepalese people
Kusunda language
People from Dang District, Nepal